Mae Soriano (born May 22, 1982) is a Filipino karateka. She won one of the bronze medals in the women's kumite 55 kg event at the 2014 Asian Games held in Incheon, South Korea. She also competed at the Asian Games in 2006, 2010 and 2018.

Soriano lost her bronze medal match in her event at the 2009 Asian Martial Arts Games held in Bangkok, Thailand. Soriano won one of the bronze medals in the women's kumite 55 kg event at the 2009 Asian Karate Championships held in Foshan, China.

Soriano won one of the bronze medals in the women's kumite 55 kg event at the 2017 Southeast Asian Games held in Kuala Lumpur, Malaysia. She also won one of the bronze medals in her event at the 2019 Southeast Asian Games held in the Philippines. She won one of the bronze medals in the women's team kumite event at the 2021 Southeast Asian Games held in Hanoi, Vietnam.

She is from Bacolod City in Negros Occidental, Philippines.

Achievements

References 

Living people
1982 births
Place of birth missing (living people)
Filipino female karateka
Karateka at the 2006 Asian Games
Karateka at the 2010 Asian Games
Karateka at the 2014 Asian Games
Karateka at the 2018 Asian Games
Medalists at the 2014 Asian Games
Asian Games medalists in karate
Asian Games bronze medalists for the Philippines
Southeast Asian Games silver medalists for the Philippines
Southeast Asian Games bronze medalists for the Philippines
Southeast Asian Games medalists in karate
Competitors at the 2011 Southeast Asian Games
Competitors at the 2013 Southeast Asian Games
Competitors at the 2017 Southeast Asian Games
Competitors at the 2019 Southeast Asian Games
Competitors at the 2021 Southeast Asian Games
21st-century Filipino women